Vokesimurex rectirostris, common name : the erect-spined murex, is a species of sea snail, a marine gastropod mollusk in the family Muricidae, the murex snails or rock snails.

Description
The shell of an adult varies between 33 mm and 80 mm.

Distribution
This marine species can be found along Southwest Japan and Vietnam.

References

External links
  Ponder W.F. & Vokes E.H. (1988) A revision of the Indo-West Pacific fossil and Recent species of Murex s.s. and Haustellum (Mollusca: Gastropoda: Muricidae). Records of the Australian Museum suppl.8: 1–160
 

Gastropods described in 1841
Vokesimurex